The Michatoya River is a river in Guatemala. It begins in the town of Amatitlán, flowing out from the lake of the same name, through the towns of Palín, Masagua, and out into the Pacific Ocean. It has served as one of the principal sources of electricity for Guatemala City. Sometimes it has overflowed its banks, flooding the city of Amatitlán, until dredging of the riverbed began, which so far has prevented further inundation.

See also
List of rivers of Guatemala

References

Rand McNally, The New International Atlas, 1993.

Rivers of Guatemala